The Liberal Party of India was a political organization espousing liberalism in the politics of India.

History and organization
The Liberal party was formed in 1910, and British intellectuals and British officials were often participating members of its committees. The Indian National Congress, which had been formed to create a mature political dialogue with the British government, included both moderates and extremists. Many moderate leaders with liberal ideas left the Congress with the rise of Indian nationalism, and extremist leaders like Bipin Chandra Pal, Lala Lajpat Rai and Bal Gangadhar Tilak.

When the Montagu report of 1918 was made public, there was a divide in the Congress over it. The moderates welcomed it while the extremists opposed it. This led to a schism in the Congress with moderate leaders forming the "Indian National Liberal Federation" in 1919. The party (INLF) was founded by Surendra Nath Banarjea and some of its prominent leaders were Tej Bahadur Sapru, V. S. Srinivasa Sastri and M. R. Jayakar.

Tej Bahadur Sapru emerged as the most important leader among the Liberals. During the agitation against the Simon Commission, he launched the idea of an all-parties conference in India to prepare an agreed constitutional scheme. This resulted in the "Nehru Report"  which proposed a constitution and persuaded the new Labour government in Britain to offer India a Round Table Conference.

A number of Liberals including Sapru and Sastri attended the first Round Table Conference (November 1930 to January 1931). They rallied the Indian Princes to the idea of an all-India federal union. Sapru and Sastri likewise attacked the communal issue, working primarily through Muhammad Ali Jinnah. The two Liberals' ultimate object was to secure a constitutional agreement, provisional if not final.

Politics
The Liberals were moderate nationalists who openly pursued India's independence from British rule and resented the excesses of British imperialism. They preferred gradual constitutional reform to revolutionary methods as the means of achieving independence and because they attempted to secure constitutional reform by cooperating with British authority rather than defying it. Their goals and methods were inspired by British Liberalism. They aimed toward parliamentary democracy, including not only an institutional structure but a system of values which emphasized the achievement of national welfare through peaceable negotiation and compromise among competing public interests. Therefore, the Liberals regularly participated in the legislative councils and assemblies at the town, provincial and central levels. 

The Government of India Act 1919 expanded the membership to the legislatures. The Liberals entered the new legislatures and attempted to make the reforms succeed so as to advance India far toward full self-government. They tried to persuade the British that Indians were a loyal opposition and well prepared for self-government, and trying also to build Indian self-respect and prove that revolutionary upheaval was unnecessary as well as dangerous. They urged for further constitutional reform, asking for an expanded Indian role in both provincial and central government. However, they had a minority position in the legislatures and hence were weakened.

In the legislative elections of 1923, most Liberal candidates were defeated, but some were returned in both the Center and the provinces, while even some of the principal leaders regained seats through nomination. Their influence during 1924–1926 depended largely on their relations with the other main parties in the Central Legislative Assembly, such as the Swaraj Party. The Liberals often voted with these other parties, though they usually went separate ways from the Swaraj Party on highly controversial issues. In general, however, they continued to occupy a slightly more conservative position than the other parties. In 1925, the Liberals joined the Swaraj Party to demand a Round Table Conference to discuss constitutional reforms.

The Liberals urged in advance that the Statutory Commission, scheduled under the terms of the Indian Reform Act of 1919 to review the case for further Indian constitutional advance, have both British and Indian members. However an all-English Commission was announced under Sir John Simon. The Liberals were among the first to denounce it and called for a boycott.

See also
Liberalism in India
Indian Independence Movement
Indian National Congress
Indian Nationalism
Leaders of the Independence Movemen

References 

Defunct political parties in India
1910 establishments in India
Political parties with year of disestablishment missing
Politics of British India